Pterolophia medioalbicollis is a species of beetle in the family Cerambycidae. It was described by Stephan von Breuning in 1965. It is known from Thailand, Borneo and Malaysia.

References

medioalbicollis
Beetles described in 1965